Ded Moroz and Summer (also known as Grandfather Frost and Summer)  is a 1969 Soviet cartoon.

Plot
Ded Moroz  (the Russian equivalent to Santa Claus) is in his house in a wintry setting, packing toys for children.  He begins to wonder what summer is.  The animals around his house think him crazy for wondering this, but he's determined to find out.  He heads south and meets several children, but finds out that he has trouble with the heat.  The children give him ice cream to help him cope.

References

External links
 

1969 films
Soviet animated films
1960s Russian-language films
1969 animated films
Soyuzmultfilm
Films set around New Year
Animated films based on children's books